Val Falvey, TD is an Irish television sitcom, created and written by Arthur Mathews and Paul Woodfull, and produced by Deadpan Pictures for RTÉ.

The series stars Ardal O'Hanlon as Val Falvey, a newly elected Teachta Dála (TD) in Dáil Éireann, who inherited his seat in the Midlands from his father, and finds himself out of his depth in the world of politics.

Cast
 Ardal O'Hanlon – Val Falvey
 Owen Roe – Pat Daly
 Amelia Crowley – Christine Falvey
 Phelim Drew – John Brolly
 Brendan Dempsey – Dessie Clinch

References

External links

RTÉ original programming
Irish television sitcoms
2009 Irish television series debuts
2009 Irish television series endings